Emmett Anthony was a vaudeville comedian who appeared on stage in various revues and shows. In December 1915 he arrived in New Orleans on the S.S. Brunswick to perform at the Iroquis Theater. He was also in the film Son of Satan and was part of Blackville Corporation's 1915 touring revival, The Mayor of Jimtown touring show in 1923, and  Harlem Darlings revue in 1929. He featured as a regular at the Crescent Theatre in 1913. He was in Liza in 1923. He received a favorable assessment for his part in Put and Take.

A June 15, 1912 review in the Indianapolis Freeman described him as excellent and noted his unique and interesting singing. 

He's also been characterized as a yodeler-comedian. Along with Charles Anderson of Birmingham he was one of the premier African American yodelers. Beulah Henderson of New Orleans was also a yodeler. He drew praise for his yodeling and comedy in a 1921 revue with Irvin Miller.

Howard University has an image of him identified as America's Premier Singing Comedian.

References

Vaudeville performers
Year of birth missing
Place of birth missing
Year of death missing
Place of death missing
Yodelers